NodeFly is a Canadian company headquartered in Vancouver, British Columbia, Canada. It develops and supports a NodeFly Application Performance Monitoring (APM) system that provides real-time monitoring for Node.js applications.

Services
Node.js is a scalable server-side JavaScript framework, and the NodeFly APM agent allows developers to monitor and improve their Node.js product by uncovering and resolving issues as they arise. CEO Glen Lougheed explained, “We’re trying to provide devops with the visibility they need to understand what’s happening with their applications — there’s really no great user-friendly tools for that.”

History
NodeFly was founded by CEO Glen Lougheed and CTO Eugene Kaydalov in 2011.
On January 23, 2012, NodeFly announced a partnership with Joyent Cloud, a high-performance public cloud, to offer Node.js analytics services to Joyent customers. On November 6, 2012, it was announced that NodeFly received $800,000 Seed Round from Shasta Venture Partners and other investors. The NodeFly APM beta product was released on November 8, 2012.
It was announced on July 23, 2013 that StrongLoop, the company that employs a few of Node.js' core contributors, acquired NodeFly’s Node.js monitoring solution. The NodeFly service has been rebranded as StrongOps, better matching the naming scheme of StrongLoop’s other products.
On September 18, 2013, the NodeFly web console was integrated into StrongLoop's website.

References

External links

Software performance management